Ebenezer Foote Norton (November 7, 1774 – May 11, 1851) was an American lawyer, businessman, and politician who served one term as a U.S. Representative from New York from 1829 to 1831.

Biography 
Born in Goshen in the Connecticut Colony, Norton completed preparatory studies.
He studied law.
He was admitted to the bar and practiced.

He moved to Buffalo, New York, in 1815.
Attorney for the Niagara Bank.
He was one of the founders of the original Buffalo Harbor Co. in 1819.

Political career 
He was a member of the New York State Assembly (Erie Co.) in 1823.

Norton was elected as a Jacksonian to the Twenty-first Congress (March 4, 1829 – March 3, 1831).
He was an unsuccessful candidate for reelection in 1830 to the Twenty-second Congress.

Later career and death 
He resumed his law practice.

He died in Buffalo, New York, May 11, 1851.

Sources

1774 births
1851 deaths
Members of the New York State Assembly
Jacksonian members of the United States House of Representatives from New York (state)
19th-century American politicians
People from Goshen, Connecticut
Politicians from Buffalo, New York

Members of the United States House of Representatives from New York (state)